The Old Heidelberg Apartments in the Point Breeze neighborhood of Pittsburgh, Pennsylvania is a building from 1905. It was listed on the National Register of Historic Places in 1976.

References

Residential buildings on the National Register of Historic Places in Pennsylvania
Residential buildings completed in 1905
Apartment buildings in Pittsburgh
City of Pittsburgh historic designations
Pittsburgh History & Landmarks Foundation Historic Landmarks
National Register of Historic Places in Pittsburgh
1905 establishments in Pennsylvania

The Old Heidelberg Apartment building in Pittsburgh's east end neighborhood of Park Place was designed by notable architect Frederick G. Scheibler. His client, Robinson and Bruckman, charged him with designing an apartment building that would fit into the neighborhood of private homes. To do this, Scheibler used a steep sheltered roof, timber-framed porches, and a stucco surface to make the building appear as a country house reminiscent of old-world Europe.